Calvin Smyre (born May 17, 1947) is an American politician who recently served as a member of the Georgia House of Representatives for the 135th district. Elected in 1974, he was the longest-serving member of the Georgia Legislature.  In May 2022, his nomination to serve as the United States ambassador to the Dominican Republic was withdrawn and he was instead nominated to serve as the United States ambassador to the Bahamas.

Early life and education 
Smyre was born in Columbus, Georgia. He earned a Bachelor of Science degree from Fort Valley State University with a focus in business administration.

Career 
Smyre has served as a delegate for Georgia to every Democratic National Convention since 1980, and became the first African American member elected from Georgia to the Democratic National Committee in 1984. He advised the presidential campaigns of Jimmy Carter, Bill Clinton, and Al Gore, and served as an elector for Georgia to the Electoral College in 1980, 1992, and 2020.

Smyre became the youngest member of the Georgia House of Representatives when he was elected to the chamber at the age of 26 in 1974.

Governor Joe Frank Harris appointed Smyre assistant floor leader in the 1983 legislative session and, in 1986, appointed him floor leader for the 1987 session, making him the first African American leader of the House since Reconstruction. In 1998, he was elected the first African American Chairman of the Democratic Party's state legislative caucus; and, in 2001, Smyre was appointed Chairman of the state Democratic Party. In 2006, he was elected President of the National Black Caucus of State Legislators. Smyre is known for helping Democrats and Republicans negotiate, acting as a liaison.

Smyre also worked as executive vice president of corporate external affairs at Synovus and president of the Synovus Foundation.

Biden administration 

On September 22, 2021, President Joe Biden announced that he would nominate Smyre to serve as the United States ambassador to the Dominican Republic. On October 4, 2021, his nomination was sent to the Senate. On May 17, 2022, his nomination was withdrawn, and he was nominated to serve as the ambassador to the Bahamas.

On May 13, 2022, President Joe Biden announced his intent to nominate Smyre to serve as the next United States ambassador to the Bahamas. On May 17, 2022, his nomination was sent to the Senate. His nomination was not acted on for the remainder of the Congress and was sent back to Biden on January 3, 2023.

President Biden renominated Smyre the same day. His nomination is pending before the Senate Foreign Relations Committee.

See also
List of ambassadors appointed by Joe Biden

References

External links
Georgia General Assembly - Representative Calvin Smyre
Project Vote Smart - Representative Calvin Smyre (GA) profile
Follow the Money - Calvin Smyre
2006 2004 2002 2000 1998 1996 campaign contributions
 Synovus - Calvin Smyre profile
 

|-

|-

|-

|-

|-

|-

|-

Democratic Party members of the Georgia House of Representatives
1947 births
Living people
Fort Valley State University alumni
African-American state legislators in Georgia (U.S. state)
People from Columbus, Georgia
21st-century American politicians
State political party chairs of Georgia (U.S. state)
2020 United States presidential electors
20th-century American politicians
1992 United States presidential electors
1980 United States presidential electors
20th-century African-American politicians
21st-century African-American politicians